The 2018–19 OK Liga Femenina is the 11th season of the top-tier league of women's rink hockey in Spain. It will start on 20 October 2018 and will end on 25 May 2019.

Hostelcur Gijón was the defending champion. Generali Palau de Plegamans achieved their second league title after beating 7–5 Manlleu in the last match of the season.

Teams
Despite being relegated in the previous season, Liceo remained in the league as their reserve team won the promotion stage for teams from the northern Spain. The other place was for Cuencas Mineras, who will make their debut in the league.

Also Reus Deportiu remained in the top tier after the resign of Catalan teams to promote.

League table

Results

Copa de la Reina

The 2019 Copa de la Reina was the 14th edition of the Spanish women's roller hockey cup.

Telecable Gijón won their fourth title ever, three years after their last win.

Draw
The draw was held at the Olympic Pavilion of Reus on 7 February 2019.

Bracket

Source: FEP.es

References

External links
Real Federación Española de Patinaje

OK Liga Femenina seasons
2018 in roller hockey
2019 in roller hockey
2018 in Spanish sport
2019 in Spanish sport